The Atascadero Administration Building is the historic facility where Atascadero City Hall conducts operations. W.D. Bliss designed the building, began construction in 1914 and completed in 1918.

History of use
The building is now a California Historical Landmark.

Earthquake damage and restoration
The building was damaged in the San Simeon Earthquake and was closed for 10 years during a period of significant restoration. The city reopened the building in August 2013.

References 

Atascadero, California
California Historical Landmarks
Buildings and structures in Atascadero, California
National Register of Historic Places in San Luis Obispo County, California
Government buildings completed in 1918